Karl Gustaf Lennart Carlsson (30 December 1932 – 16 January 2013) was a Swedish race walker. He placed 14th in the 20 km event at the 1960 Summer Olympics and fourth at the 1958 European Championships, 16 seconds behind his compatriot Lennart Back.

References

External links
 

1932 births
2013 deaths
Athletes (track and field) at the 1960 Summer Olympics
Olympic athletes of Sweden
Swedish male racewalkers
Sportspeople from Linköping
20th-century Swedish people
21st-century Swedish people